Chenereilles may refer to the following places in France:

 Chenereilles, Loire, a commune in the Loire department
 Chenereilles, Haute-Loire, a commune in the Haute-Loire department